Desert Wonderland is a 1942 American short documentary film directed by Russ Shields and Jack Kuhne exploring the Grand Canyon. It was nominated for an Academy Award at the 15th Academy Awards for Best Short Subject (One-Reel). The film was preserved by the Academy Film Archive in 2016.

References

External links 
 

1942 films
1942 short films
1942 documentary films
Black-and-white documentary films
American short documentary films
Films shot in Arizona
Works about the Grand Canyon
20th Century Fox short films
Documentary films about Arizona
1940s English-language films
1940s American films
1940s short documentary films